A fried chicken restaurant is a fast food restaurant, often a chain, that serves (mainly) fried chicken—usually chunks of chicken, battered or breaded and deep-fried.

United States 

The concept of the fried chicken restaurant originated in the United States. These restaurants may also serve other food items, such as roast or grilled chicken, seafood, or hamburgers. KFC (previously Kentucky Fried Chicken) is a well-known example. Others include:

 Baes Fried Chicken
 Bojangles'
 Brown's Chicken & Pasta
 Bush's Chicken
 Chick-Fil-A
 Chicken Delight
 Chicken Express
 Church's Chicken
 Crown Fried Chicken
 Golden Chick
 Gus's World Famous Fried Chicken
 Harold's Chicken Shack
 Jollibee
 Kennedy Fried Chicken
 KFC
 Krispy Krunchy Chicken
 Lee's Famous Recipe Chicken
 Mrs. Winner's
 Pollo Campero
 Popeyes Louisiana Kitchen
 Raising Cane's Chicken Fingers
 Roy Rogers
 Smithfield's Chicken 'N Bar-B-Q
 Zaxby's

Canada 

Chains of fried chicken fast-food restaurants originating in Canada include Dixie Lee based in Napanee, Ontario and Mary Brown's based in Markham, Ontario. Several US-based chains have also outlets in Canada, including KFC and Popeyes Chicken & Biscuits.

United Kingdom 

Restaurants are commonplace in inner city areas of the United Kingdom. The United Kingdom has one of the largest, fastest growing and most diverse fried chicken markets in the world, with about 1,000 individual brands and 1,700 outlets. Shop signs are commonly designed in a red, white and blue colour scheme, and include a drawing or cartoon of a chicken, as well as a reference to the Southern United States.

Especially popular in poor and ethnic minority neighbourhoods, fried chicken restaurants have been criticised for contributing to urban blight. For instance, Tottenham MP David Lammy has stated that the proliferation of chicken joints hampers prosperity in his constituency. Residents in Waltham Forest see them as "eyesores that encourage anti-social behaviour", according to a poll.

Chicken shops are nevertheless important cultural institutions in the UK, particular for black and Asian communities. As meeting places and providers of cheap meals, they play an important role in underserved neighbourhoods hit hard by the impacts of austerity and other government policies.

Other popular UK chicken brands include Chicken Cottage, Morley's, and Dixy Chicken.

Other countries 

Australia
 Chooks Fresh & Tasty, originally named River Rooster, with, 39 stores, mainly in Western Australia. There is also Country Fried Chicken, Oporto and Red Rooster.
Colombia
 Pollo Campero, a Guatemalan fried chicken restaurant chain with over 200 locations in twelve countries, including 50 in the United States.
Nigeria
 Tastee Fried Chicken, a fast food fried chicken restaurant with eight locations, based in Lagos, Nigeria.
Philippines
 Jollibee, a fast food chain with over 1500 branches worldwide.
 Max's Restaurant, with over 100 branches in the Philippines and several more in the United States.
South Africa
 Chicken Licken
 Hungry Lion
South Korea
Bonchon Chicken, the most famous fried chicken chain of South Korea, with over 338 branches in the South Korea, Asia, Middle East and United States.
Taiwan
TKK Fried Chicken, most popular Taiwanese fried chicken restaurant in Taiwan and overseas.

See also

 Chicken restaurant
 List of fast-food chicken restaurants
 National Fried Chicken Day

References 

 
Fried chicken